The 2016 Tennessee Democratic presidential primary took place on March 1 in the U.S. state of Tennessee as one of the Democratic Party's primaries ahead of the 2016 presidential election.

On the same day, dubbed "Super Tuesday," Democratic primaries were held in ten other states plus American Samoa, while the Republican Party held primaries in eleven states including their own Tennessee primary.

Opinion polling

Results

Primary date: March 1, 2016
National delegates: 75

Results by county

Analysis 
Clinton swept Tennessee, winning the primary in a 34-point-routing over Bernie Sanders. The intensity of her victory in the primary was delivered by African American voters, who comprised 32% of the electorate and backed Clinton over Sanders by a margin of 89-10. Clinton also won the white vote 57-42. Clinton swept all income levels and educational attainment levels in Tennessee. And though Sanders won the youth vote, Clinton won among voters over the age of 45 by a margin of 78-21.

Her strong support among African American voters handed Clinton an 82-18 showing in the Memphis area. She also won in Nashville 66-33, in Central Tennessee 66-35, and in Eastern Tennessee which is whiter and considered to be an extension of Appalachia by a margin of 58-42.

References

Tennessee
Democratic primary
2016